Tom Sawyer is a 1973 American musical film adaptation of Mark Twain's 1876 boyhood adventure story The Adventures of Tom Sawyer. Directed by Don Taylor, the film stars Johnny Whitaker as the title character, Jodie Foster as Becky Thatcher, Jeff East as Huckleberry Finn, and Ho–Chunk tribesman Kunu Hank portrayed Injun Joe.

The film was produced by Reader's Digest in collaboration with Arthur P. Jacobs who was best known for producing the Planet of the Apes films. The film's screenplay and songs were written by Robert B. Sherman and Richard M. Sherman, who would go on to provide award–winning music for the film's 1974 sequel Huckleberry Finn.

At the 46th Academy Awards, the film received three nominations – Best Original Score, Best Production Design and Best Costume Design, but failed to win any.

Plot

Tom Sawyer and Huckleberry Finn play hooky from school and plan to revive a dead cat with the spirit of a man named Hoss Williams who is on his death bed. Sawyer and Finn talk with Muff Potter, the town drunk, but are interrupted when Injun Joe says that Doc Robinson wants to see them. Muff and Joe meet Robinson and he informs them that they have a job to dig 
up the grave of Williams. Meanwhile, Tom continues to skip school and comes up with fantastic stories about why he is not home for dinner. When Aunt Polly decides to reprimand him, Tom tricks the children of the town to do his punishment chores for him.

After Williams dies, Tom and Huck go to the cemetery and find out that Muff and Joe are digging up William's grave on the orders of Robinson. Joe becomes upset with Robinson and demands more money for the job. When Robinson refuses, Injun Joe begins a scuffle. In an attempt to defend himself, Robinson grabs a shovel and accidentally knocks Muff out. Joe hits Doc Robinson into the grave with the shovel, then grabs Muff's knife and jumps in after Robinson
and kills him. Tom and Huck witness all this and then flee, making a pact never to tell anyone what they saw.

Joe frames Muff for the murder and Muff goes to jail. Meanwhile, Becky Thatcher moves to town which sends Sawyer into a romantic daze. At the trial for Muff, Tom is unable to contain himself as Joe is called to the stand and lies about the incident, continuing to frame Muff for the murder. As Tom is called to the stand, he relates what happened, not mentioning that Huck was with him. Suddenly, Injun Joe throws a knife at Tom, narrowly missing Tom's head and jumps out the window of the courthouse, fleeing.

After the trial, Tom and Becky get "engaged", but that quickly ends when Tom mentions he is also engaged to Amy Lawrence. After sulking, Tom is attacked by Huck for "breaking the pact" and they both decide to run away. While paddling down the Mississippi, their raft is capsized by a passing riverboat and they end up on an island, where they enjoy freedom and muse over what happened to Injun Joe. While on the island, they witness some people "dragging the river", a process where a cannon is fired to bring up any bodies from the bottom of the river.

Tom and Huck decide to go home and find out that there is a funeral being held for them. The funeral service breaks up when Judge Thatcher sees them in the back of the church. The Widow Douglas takes Huck under her wing, teaching him how to be civilized. Later, at an Independence Day celebration, Tom and Becky go into McDougal's Cave for a drink of water from the underground spring and run into Injun Joe. Joe chases them through the cave, intent on killing Tom. However, Judge Thatcher, Muff, and Huck catch up to Joe and Muff tosses a torch at Joe, who falls to his death.

Some time later, Huck disappears, worrying the Widow Douglas and Tom finds him at the old fishing place where they hang out. Tom berates Huck for worrying the Widow, telling Huck that fun and games doesn’t last forever. Heck is left contemplating whether or not to return to Douglas (leading to the events of Huckleberry Finn). When Tom returns to town, he sees that Muff decides to leave town. Muff tells Tom that they might run into each other in the future. Soon after, Judge Thatcher agrees to take Tom and Becky on a two week trip to St. Louis. Before he leaves, Tom reconciles with his family and resolves to be a better person.

Cast

 Johnny Whitaker as Tom Sawyer
 Jodie Foster as Becky Thatcher
 Jeff East as Huckleberry Finn
 Celeste Holm as Aunt Polly
 Warren Oates as Muff Potter
 Lucille Benson as Widder Douglas
 Henry Jones as Mr. Dobbins
 Noah Keen as Judge Thatcher
 Dub Taylor as Clayton
 Richard Eastham as Doc Robinson
 Sandy Kenyon as Constable Clemmens
 Joshua Hill Lewis as Cousin Sidney
 Susan Joyce as Cousin Mary
 Steve Hogg as Ben Rogers 
 Sean Summers as Billy Fisher
 Kevin Jefferson as Joe Jefferson
 Page Williams as Saloon Girl
 James A. Kuhn as Blacksmith
 Mark Lynch as Prosecuting Attorney 
 Jonathan Taylor as Small Boy
 Anne Voss as Girl
 Frederick Allen as a Hobo/Crying Man at the Funeral
 Kunu Hank as Injun Joe

Jodie Foster and Johnny Whitaker had starred together in Napoleon and Samantha the previous year.

Production
The film was shot in Arrow Rock and Lupus, Missouri. Meramec Caverns in Stanton, Missouri provided the cave settings.

As a Mormon, Whitaker was prohibited from using tobacco. In the scene in which Tom and Huck carve a pipe and smoke it together, cabbage leaves were substituted in place of tobacco, at Whitaker's insistence.

Another similar film, also titled "Tom Sawyer," was released on television that same year, which was shot at Upper Canada Village, in Ontario. Originally broadcast on CBS on March 23, 1973, it starred Josh Albee as Tom and Jeff Tyler as Huck. Los Angeles Times critic Don Page called it a "pleasant treatment" of the novel, although he found Albee "low-key" and Tyler "uncharismatic." "The best performances come from the veterans," Page noted, "especially Buddy Ebsen as the pitiful but lovable town sot, Muff Potter. Jane Wyatt as forgiving Aunt Polly, Vic Morrow as the sinister Injun Joe and John McGiver as Judge Thatcher are excellent. ... Jane Holloway's script is bright enough, but the youngsters fail to ignite the spark." The presentation was sponsored by Dr. Pepper and featured a
dog named Pepper accompanying Tom and Huck on their adventures.

The paddle–wheeled boat used in the theatrical musical film was the Julia Belle Swain, currently (as of September 24, 2013) moored at Riverside Park in La Crosse, Wisconsin.

Awards and nominations
At the 31st Golden Globe Awards, the Sherman Brothers, along with John Williams, received a nomination for Best Original Score. The trio would later be nominated for an Academy Award for Best Music, Scoring Original Song Score and/or Adaptation. Tom Sawyer also received Academy Award nominations for Best Art Direction–Set Decoration (Philip M. Jefferies, Robert De Vestel) and Best Costume Design (Donfeld).

Songs
 River Song (The Theme from “Tom Sawyer”) Charley Pride, Chorus & Orchestra 
 Tom Sawyer – Aunt Polly, Mary, Sidney
 Gratifaction – Boys
 How Come? – Tom
 If'n I Was God – Tom
 A Man's Gotta Be (What He's Born to Be) Tom, Huckleberry and Muff
 Hannibal, Mo(Zouree) – Cast
 Freebootin''' – Tom, Huckleberry
 Aunt Polly's Soliloquy'' – Aunt Polly

References

External links

 
 
 
 

1973 films
1970s adventure films
1970s musical films
American adventure films
American children's films
American musical films
Films scored by John Williams
Films about orphans
Films based on American novels
Films based on The Adventures of Tom Sawyer
Films directed by Don Taylor
Films set in the 19th century
Films set in Missouri
Films shot in Missouri
Musicals by the Sherman Brothers
Reader's Digest
United Artists films
1970s English-language films
1970s American films